Marquis  was a vice admiral in the Imperial Japanese Navy during World War II.

Biography
Born in Chiyoda, Tokyo into a kuge family of court nobility related to the Fujiwara aristocracy, Daigo was a graduate of the Gakushuin Peers' school. He went on to graduate from the 40th class of the Imperial Japanese Naval Academy in 1912. His rank on entering was only 126th out of 150 cadets, but he improved his scores, so that he graduated at 17th out of 144.

Daigo served as a midshipman on the cruiser  and battleship . As an ensign, he was assigned to the cruiser .

After his promotion to sub-lieutenant in 1913, he took time out to attend a session of the House of Peers as was obligatory for members of his social class. He then returned to active service on the battleship  and destroyer .

He also served on the cruiser  in 1924.

He was promoted to rear admiral on 15 November 1940.

Daigo commanded Submarine Squadron 5 (Subron 5), with his flag on the light cruiser  at the start of the Pacific War. At the time of the attack on Pearl Harbor, Subron 5 was covering the first wave of the Malaya Invasion Force south of the Cape of Camau, French Indochina.

On 9 December 1941, Subron 5 was ordered to pursue and sink the Royal Navy Force Z (battleship , battlecruiser  and supporting destroyers). Although Yura received word from  that the British ships were spotted, due to poor wireless reception, the signal was unclear and the British vessels were overwhelmed by torpedo bombers of the 22nd Air Flotilla from bases in Indochina before Yura and her submarines could take action.

Subron 5 was then assigned to the invasion of Sarawak from 13–26 December, covering landings in Brunei, Miri, Seria, and Kuching. The 2,500 men of the "Kawaguchi Detachment" and the No. 2 Yokosuka Special Naval Landing Force (SNLF) quickly captured Miri's airfield and oil fields. The operation was completed, and Yura returned to its base at Camranh Bay, Indochina by the end of the year.

Subron 5 was also part of the advance screening force for the Battle of Midway.

Daigo became vice admiral on 1 November 1943. He was assigned command of the Eastern Attack Group which carried out midget submarine and merchant shipping attacks on the east coast of Australia.

Daigo was Commandant of the Naval Submarine School from 23 August 1944 and final Commander in Chief of the IJN 6th Fleet from 1 May 1945. During these assignments, he was involved in the kaiten human-torpedo program.

After the end of the war, Daigo was arrested by SCAP authorities at the request of the Netherlands government, and was extradited to Batavia in the Dutch East Indies, where he was charged with war crimes in connection with the kidnapping, torture and massacre of 21,000 people (including women and children) by Japanese troops in Pontianak during the Pontianak incidents. After being held for several months under severe conditions, he was found guilty in a closed military tribunal at Pontianak after only three hours of testimony, during which time he was not allowed to speak in his own defense. He was found guilty and executed with a rifle shot to the stomach on 6 December 1947. As Daigo was commander of submarine forces, (although from 8 November 1943 the 22nd Special Guard Division based at Balikpapan, Borneo fell nominally under his command), his connection (if any) with the events in Pontianak from 23 April 1943 – 28 June 1944 remain very unclear. Whereas other "Class B" war criminals found guilty of professional negligence for atrocities committed by junior staff under their nominal command were sentenced to several years in prison, the speed and secrecy surrounding his trial, and the severity and brutality of his punishment, have created questions which remain unanswered.

Notable Positions Held
Crewmember, BB Kongo - 1 December 1916 – 1 April 1917
Chief Equipping Officer, SS RO-64 - 15 January 1925 – 30 April 1925
Commanding Officer, SS RO-64 - 30 April 1925 – 1 December 1925
Staff Officer, Yokosuka Naval District - 1 December 1925 – 1 March 1926
ComSubDiv 9–1 December 1932 – 15 November 1933
ComSubDiv 19–15 November 1933 – 15 November 1934
Commanding Officer, CL Yubari - 15 November 1934 – 25 May 1935
Commanding Officer, CL Naka - 25 May 1935 – 15 November 1935
Commanding Officer, CL Kuma - 15 November 1935 – 1 December 1936
Commanding Officer, CA Takao - 1 December 1936 – 3 June 1938
Commanding Officer, CA Ashigara - 3 June 1938 – 1 December 1938
ComSubRon 5–20 October 1941 – 10 July 1942
Acting Commanding Officer, Kure SubRon - 31 August 1942 – 1 April 1943
ComSubRon 11–1 April 1943 – 20 October 1943
Commander-in-Chief, 6th Fleet - 1 May 1945 – 15 September 1945

Dates of Promotion
Midshipman - 17 July 1912
Ensign - 1 December 1913
Sublieutenant - 13 December 1915
Lieutenant - 1 December 1918
Lieutenant Commander - 1 December 1924
Commander - 30 November 1929
Captain - 15 November 1934
Rear Admiral - 15 November 1940
Vice Admiral - 1 November 1943

Ancestry

References

Books

External links

Notes

1891 births
1947 deaths
Imperial Japanese Navy admirals
Japanese admirals of World War II
Kazoku
People from Chiyoda, Tokyo
Japanese people executed for war crimes
Executed military personnel
People executed by the Netherlands by firearm